Acta Classica: Proceedings of the Classical Association of South Africa is an annual academic journal that covers all aspects of classical studies, including studies in ancient literature and history, as well as Patristic and Byzantine themes. It is published by the Classical Association of South Africa. The editor-in-chief is Martine de Marre (University of South Africa).

According to SCImago Journal Rank (SJR), the journal h-index is 5, ranking it to Q4 in Classics.

History 
The publication of the first volume of Acta Classica coincided with the retirement of Professor T. J. Haarhoff from the University of the Witwatersrand in 1958. The editorial committee was made up by Prof. F. Smuts (Stellenbosch University), Prof. G. P. Goold (University of Manitoba; formerly University of Cape Town), Prof. G. van N. Viljoen (University of South Africa), Dr. C. P. T. Naude (University of Witwatersrand), Dr. P. L. Nicolaides (Johannesburg), and Mr. B. L. Hijmans (University of Cape Town). The journal superseded the short-lived Proceedings and Selected Papers of the Classical Association of South Africa, of which only two volumes were produced: First Issue: 1927-1929 and Second Issue: 1929–1931.

Previous editors of the journal: Frans Smuts (1958); Gerrit Viljoen (1959–1966); Henri Gonin (1967–1984); Ursula Vogel-Weidemann (1985–1996); William Henderson (1997–2004); Louise Cilliers (2005–2009); David Wardle (2010–2012); John Hilton (2013-2022).

References

External links 
 

Classics journals
English-language journals
Publications established in 1958
Annual journals
Academic journals published by learned and professional societies